Durulmuş is a village near the town of Hafik in Sivas Province, Turkey.

External links
 Durulmuş Official Website

Villages in Hafik District